The 1996–97 Botola is the 41st season of the Moroccan Premier League. Raja Casablanca are the holders of the title.

References

Morocco 1996–97

Botola seasons
Morocco
Botola